Ali Muhammad Brown (born 1985) is the prime suspect in a 2014 murder spree. Police believe, and Brown has confessed to killing Ahmed Said, Dwone Anderson-Young, and Leroy Henderson in Seattle and 19-year-old college student Brendan Tevlin in West Orange, New Jersey, between April and June 2014. Brown was previously convicted of bank fraud believed to be in support of terrorists in Somalia, and "communication with a minor for immoral purposes".

After his arrest, Brown told investigators that he is guided strictly by his faith, and that the killings were "just" because they were in retaliation for actions by the U.S. government in Iraq, Syria and Afghanistan.

Timeline

Brown was born in the United States, and he has family in New Jersey.

From January 2002 to November 2004, Brown with three accomplices defrauded the Bank of America, Washington Mutual, Wells Fargo, and other banks out of large sums of money. The group was led by barber Ruben Shumpert who later fled to Somalia, where he died fighting for Al-Shabaab. The check kiting scam involved depositing bad checks, and then withdrawing cash before the checks were returned. Authorities believed that the effort was to fund militant Islamist terrorist groups in Somalia, but were unable to prove the link. Brown was convicted of bank fraud in federal court in 2005 and served time in prison.

In March 2012, Brown pleaded guilty to "communication with a minor for immoral purposes" and served a year in prison.

On April 27, 2014, Leroy Henderson was shot 10 times and killed by a man later identified as Brown in a drive-by shooting in his girlfriend's Dodge Durango in Seattle's Skyway neighborhood.

On June 1, Ahmed Said, 27, and Dwone Anderson-Young, 23, were killed execution-style shortly after midnight in the Leschi neighborhood of Seattle shortly after they left a gay nightclub. Both victims were gay, Ahmed Said was apparently lured by being contacted on Grindr, a hookup app for gay and bisexual men. The case was soon investigated as a possible hate crime. They were shot multiple times in Said's car and the suspect left a bloody palm print behind, along with distinctive 9mm casings.

On June 25, 2014, 19-year-old Brendan Tevlin was returning from a friend's house in a Jeep Liberty to his home when he was approached by three men at an intersection in West Orange, New Jersey. While one man stayed in his car, Brown and Jeremy Villagran surrounded Tevlin's car as Brown opened fire into the closed passenger window 10 times and striking Tevlin eight times. Brown pushed the body onto the passenger seat floor and drove to an apartment complex about a mile away, and stole some personal items.

Four days later, Brown is believed to have tried to steal a car from a man at gunpoint, but could not drive a stick shift, so he fled. At a nearby convenience store, he changed clothes, and is seen with his head and face on a security video covered by a checkered keffiyeh head scarf. On July 18, the fugitive was arrested in New Jersey, found camping in the woods in a lean-to shelter. With him was a notebook on how to carry on warfare and evade authorities. Brown and 3 others pleaded not guilty to the murders of Tevlin and recent high school graduate and cheerleader Cheyanne Bond on August 6.

By August 20, 2014, Brown had been charged with three counts of aggravated murder in the 1st degree, each of which occurred in Seattle Washington, including a slaying in Skyway (King County) Washington. Brown also committed a fourth murder in West Orange (Essex County), New Jersey, on June 14, 2014.  A murder indictment on the New Jersey count was expected sometime in April or May, 2015. As of July 2015, Brown was charged with terrorism.

On March 6, 2018, Brown was convicted in Essex County Court on many charges.

Motive 
Brown is a convert to Islam and a jihadi who defended his actions as being "just kills", or justified shootings, of adult males in retaliation for actions by the U.S. government in Iraq, Syria and Afghanistan. As he stated to authorities: "All those lives are taken every single day by America, by this government. So a life for a life."

See also
Orlando nightclub shooting

References 

1985 births
21st-century American criminals
American male criminals
American serial killers
Islamic terrorism in the United States
Living people
Male serial killers
Violence against gay men in the United States
Violence against men in North America